Nancy Margaret Edwards,  (born 8 January 1954) is a British archaeologist and academic, who specialises in medieval archaeology and ecclesiastical history. Since 2008, she has been Professor of Medieval Archaeology at Bangor University.

Early life and education
Edwards was born on 8 January 1954 in Portsmouth, Hampshire, England to David Cyril Bonner Edwards and Ann Edwards. She was educated at Portsmouth High School, an all-girls private school in Southsea, Portsmouth. She then studied archaeology, ancient history, and medieval history at the University of Liverpool, graduating with a Bachelor of Arts (BA) degree in 1976. She undertook postgraduate research in archaeology at Durham University, and completed her Doctor of Philosophy (PhD) degree in 1982. Her doctoral thesis was titled "A reassessment of the early medieval stone crosses and related sculpture of Offaly, Kilkenny and Tipperary".

Academic career
Edwards has spent all her academic career at Bangor University (or its predecessors University College of North Wales and University of Wales, Bangor). She was a lecturer from 1979 to 1992, a senior lecturer from 1992 to 1999, and a reader from 1999 to 2008. In 2008, she was appointed Professor of Medieval Archaeology.

In addition to her full-time positions at Bangor, Edwards has held a number of temporary visiting appointments. She was a visiting fellow at Clare Hall, Cambridge in 1991 and at All Souls College, Oxford in 2007. She was the O'Donnell Lecturer in Celtic Studies at the University of Oxford in 1999/2000; lecturing on "Early Medieval Stones and Stone Sculpture in Wales: Context and Connections".

Edwards is Chair of the Royal Commission on the Ancient and Historical Monuments of Wales. She also served as the Chair of the Gwynedd Archaeological Trust from 2004 until 2018.

Personal life
In 1983, Edwards married Anthony Huw Pryce. Together they have one son.

Honours
On 4 May 1989, Edwards was elected a Fellow of the Society of Antiquaries of London (FSA). In 2012, she was elected a Fellow of the Learned Society of Wales (FLSW). In July 2016, she was elected a Fellow of the British Academy (FBA), the UK's national academy for the humanities and the social sciences.

Selected works

References

Living people
British archaeologists
British women archaeologists
20th-century archaeologists
21st-century archaeologists
British medievalists
Women medievalists
Fellows of the Society of Antiquaries of London
Fellows of the British Academy
Fellows of the Learned Society of Wales
1954 births
People educated at Portsmouth High School (Southsea)
Alumni of the University of Liverpool
21st-century British women writers
20th-century British women writers
British women historians
Alumni of Durham University Graduate Society
Medieval archaeologists